Anis Birou ( – born 10 January 1962, Berkane) is a Moroccan politician of the National Rally of Independents. Between 2007 and 2012, he held the position of Secretary of State for Crafts in the cabinet of Abbas El Fassi.  He holds a degree in statistics engineering.

See also
Cabinet of Morocco

References

Government ministers of Morocco
1962 births
Living people
People from Berkane
Moroccan engineers
Moroccan civil servants
National Rally of Independents politicians